Wheatonville is an unincorporated community in Greer Township, Warrick County, in the U.S. state of Indiana.

History
A post office was established at Wheatonville in 1860, and remained in operation until it was discontinued in 1872.

Geography

References

Unincorporated communities in Warrick County, Indiana
Unincorporated communities in Indiana